Akkol is a town located in the Talas District, Zhambyl Region, Kazakhstan. Since 1977 it is part of Akkol rural district (КАТО code — 316231100).

Demographics 
According to the 2009 Kazakhstan census, the town has a population of 2327 people. In 1999 the town had a population of 3103.

Geography
Two lakes lie in the vicinity, Akkol close to the southwest and Ashchykol  to the northwest.

References

Populated places in Jambyl Region

ru:Акколь (Жамбылская область)